Yuichiro Kamiyama (born 7 April 1968) is a Japanese former track cyclist. He competed at the 1996 Summer Olympics and the 2000 Summer Olympics.

References

External links
 

1968 births
Living people
Japanese male cyclists
Olympic cyclists of Japan
Cyclists at the 1996 Summer Olympics
Cyclists at the 2000 Summer Olympics
Sportspeople from Tochigi Prefecture
Asian Games medalists in cycling
Asian Games gold medalists for Japan
Asian Games silver medalists for Japan
Cyclists at the 1986 Asian Games
Cyclists at the 1998 Asian Games
Cyclists at the 2002 Asian Games
Medalists at the 1986 Asian Games
Medalists at the 1998 Asian Games
Medalists at the 2002 Asian Games
20th-century Japanese people
21st-century Japanese people